Anolis umbrivagus is a species of lizard in the family Dactyloidae. The species is found in Colombia.

References

Anoles
Reptiles described in 2005
Endemic fauna of Colombia
Reptiles of Colombia